This is a list of Canadian films which were released in 2006:

See also
 2006 in Canada
 2006 in Canadian television

External links
Feature Films Released In 2006 With Country of Origin Canada at IMDb
Canada's Top Ten for 2006 (list of top ten Canadian feature films, selected in a process administered by TIFF)
 List of 2006 box office number-one films in Canada

2006
2006 in Canadian cinema
Canada